Çankırıspor is a sports club located in Çankırı, Turkey.

Gallery

External links 
Çankırıspor Official Website
Çankırı Spor on TFF page

 
Sport in Çankırı
Football clubs in Turkey
Association football clubs established in 1993
1993 establishments in Turkey